The following highways are numbered 855:

Canada
  Alberta Highway 855
  New Brunswick Route 855

United States